Instruction or instructions may refer to:

Computing
 Instruction, one operation of a processor within a computer architecture instruction set
 Computer program, a collection of instructions

Music
 Instruction (band), a 2002 rock band from New York City, US
 "Instruction" (song), a 2017 song by English DJ Jax Jones
 Instructions (album), a 2001 album by Jermaine Dupri

Other uses
 Instruction, teaching or education performed by a teacher
 Sebayt, a work of the ancient Egyptian didactic literature aiming to teach ethical behaviour
 Instruction, the pre-trial phase of an investigation led by a judge in an inquisitorial system of justice
 Instruction manual, an instructional book or booklet
 Instruction manual (gaming), a booklet that instructs the player on how to play the game

See also
 Instructor (disambiguation)
 Command (disambiguation)